San Pablo Province is a province of the Cajamarca Region in Peru. The capital of the province is the city of San Pablo.

Political division 
The province measures  and is divided into four districts:

References 

Provinces of the Cajamarca Region